Meineckia ovata is a species of plant in the family Phyllanthaceae. It is endemic to the Taita Hills in Kenya.  It is threatened by habitat loss.

References

Flora of Kenya
ovata
Endemic flora of Kenya
Taxonomy articles created by Polbot

Critically endangered flora of Africa